Remote Luxury may refer to:
 Remote Luxury (album), a 1984 album by The Church
 Remote Luxury (EP), a 1984 EP by The Church